In the United Kingdom a Housing Market Area (HMA) is a statistical area where patterns of demand for housing are observed. These are influenced by commuting patterns, internal migration and house prices. HMAs reflect the fact that people may live in one local authority area but commute to another area.

References

See also
Travel to work area

Geography of the United Kingdom